Tyson Fury vs. Anthony Joshua is a proposed heavyweight professional boxing match contested between WBC champion, Tyson Fury, and former WBA (Super), IBF, WBO and IBO champion, Anthony Joshua. The fight has been dubbed as "the biggest fight in British boxing history".
As of March 2023, no agreement has been reached which secured a fight between the two heavyweights.

Background

2020 

After Fury defeated Deontay Wilder via seventh-round technical knockout (TKO) to capture the WBC and Ring heavyweight titles in February 2020, Wilder immediately activated a contractual rematch clause. The trilogy fight was initially scheduled to take place on 18 July, but after Wilder suffered an injury and due to concerns over the COVID-19 pandemic, the bout was postponed until October. At Wilder's request, the bout was again pushed back to 19 December. After Wilder's team again requested to push the date back into 2021, Fury announced in October that he was moving on from a proposed third fight, stating, "they asked me if I would agree to push it to December. I agreed to Dec. 19. Then they tried to change the date again into next year. I've been training. I'm ready. When they tried moving off Dec. 19 and pushing to next year, enough was enough. I've moved on." Following Fury's comments, Wilder released a video on social media, accusing Fury of cheating during their February fight. With team Fury insisting that the contractual rematch clause has expired and team Wilder insisting the opposite, both sides entered into a mediation process in an attempt to resolve the dispute. However, according to Fury's promoter, Bob Arum, Fury has insisted that he will not fight Wilder again due to the accusations of cheating.

Joshua defeated Andy Ruiz Jr. in a rematch in December 2019 to reclaim his unified heavyweight titles. Later that month, the WBO ordered Joshua to enter negotiations with their mandatory challenger Oleksandr Usyk. The following day, the IBF also ordered Joshua to face their mandatory challenger, Kubrat Pulev. Due to the IBF initially ordering Joshua to face Pulev in early 2019, before the rematch with Ruiz, it was determined that Pulev would be first in line with Usyk set to face the winner. After an original date in June was postponed due to the COVID-19 pandemic, Joshua defeated Pulev via ninth-round TKO in December 2020. After the victory, Joshua was asked in the post-fight interview about the prospect of an undisputed fight with Fury, Joshua said, "I want a challenge. It's not about the opponent. It's about the legacy and the belt. Whoever's got the belt, I'd love to compete with him. If that is Tyson Fury, let it be Tyson Fury. It's no big deal." Fury released a video on social media in response to Joshua's comments, saying, "Well there you go everyone, Anthony Joshua just shit his self live on television. He got asked did he want the fight, and he went around the bushes and put his arse on the edge. I want the fight! I want the fight next! I'll knock him out inside three rounds! He's a big bum dosser. Can't wait to knock him out."

2021 

A two-fight deal between the two champions has been agreed in principle since June 2020, with the first fight having a 50–50 purse split and the rematch a 60–40 split in favour of the winner. In March 2021, it was reported that both teams had signed the contract, with the final details of a date and venue to be determined.

On 17 May 2021, an announcement was made that the fight would take place on 14 August 2021 at a venue in Saudi Arabia. However, 24 hours after the announcement was made, a judge in a US court ruled that Deontay Wilder was entitled to exercise his option for a third fight with Fury on a date up to 15 September. This put the proposed bout between Joshua and Fury in jeopardy, as Wilder indicated that he was not prepared to stand aside to allow the British boxers to proceed. As a result of the difficulties in agreeing to the fight between Joshua and Fury, on 21 May the WBO gave the Joshua camp 48 hours to come to an agreement for the fight with Fury, or they would instead order a bout against their mandatory challenger, Oleksandr Usyk. On 22 May, the WBO issued an instruction that Joshua would have to fight Usyk, with an agreement for the bout to be in place by 31 May. The following day, Fury announced that he had signed a contract for a third fight with Wilder, to be held in Las Vegas.

Joshua and Usyk came to an agreement to stage their bout on 25 September 2021 at Tottenham Hotspur Stadium, where Joshua suffered the second professional loss of his career when Usyk produced a dominant display to emerge the victor by unanimous decision, with Joshua's performance being labelled "a strange, almost hapless display". Conversely, two weeks later on 9 October at the T-Mobile Arena in Las Vegas, Fury was victorious, knocking Wilder out in the eleventh round of their trilogy bout to retain his undefeated record, in a fight described as "an all-time epic heavyweight championship fight" and "the obvious fight of the year so far". Fury–Wilder III was later designated as The Ring magazine Fight of the Year 2021.

2022 

With Fury having made his first successful defence of his WBC and Ring titles against Wilder, WBC president Mauricio Sulaiman ordered Fury to face his mandatory challenger, WBC interim heavyweight champion Dillian Whyte. The fight between Fury and Whyte took place on 23 April at Wembley Stadium in London, England in front of a record-breaking crowd of 94,000 fans; 4,000 more than the attendance of Anthony Joshua vs. Wladimir Klitschko which previously took place at the same venue in 2017, thus setting a new attendance record for a boxing match in Europe. Fury punctuated a dominant performance with a jab, right uppercut combination at the end of the sixth round of the bout to send Whyte sprawling to the canvas; the referee subsequently waved off the fight, declaring Fury the winner by sixth-round technical knockout, and still the undefeated WBC and Ring heavyweight champion.

Almost four months after Fury's triumphant return to the ring, he vacated The Ring title on 13 August. One week later in Jeddah, Saudi Arabia on 20 August, Joshua faced Usyk in a rematch of their first bout eleven months earlier, with the now-vacant Ring title on the line for the Usyk–Joshua II winner, in addition to Usyk's unified world titles. With Usyk outboxing Joshua again over the 12-round distance to win, this time via split decision, Joshua succumbed to a second consecutive defeat to bring his professional boxing record to 24–3. After the fight, Joshua threw the title belts out of the ring and started to walk out of the arena, before returning to give a bizarre and emotional speech. Shortly after, Joshua was recorded backstage responding to a bystander who had criticised him, yelling: "Who are you talking to? Who are you talking to? Shut your fucking mouth.”

In the aftermath of Usyk–Joshua II, an undisputed fight in the near future between the two undefeated heavyweight champions Fury and Usyk seemed likely, until on 2 September, Usyk issued a statement in Kyiv, Ukraine at a press conference, confirming that he refuses to face Fury in December 2022: "Fighting Tyson Fury in December is impossible. For two reasons. First, I have old injuries that need to be treated... Second, I just don’t want to box in December." Despite his stance on the potential fight with Fury, Usyk expressed interest in a trilogy fight against Joshua, saying, “If Fury floats away, then maybe we will agree on a third fight with Joshua.”

Fury reacted to these developments on 5 September by calling out Joshua, saying in a video message: "Anthony Joshua, I know you've just lost a fight to Usyk, and I know you're belt-less at the moment, and I'd like to give you an opportunity to fight me for the WBC heavyweight championship of the world and the lineal championship in the next few months." Joshua responded by accepting the challenge, stating he would be "ready in December". Fury announced that his side had offered Joshua 40% of a 60–40 purse split, which Joshua's promoter Eddie Hearn confirmed on 7 September that they had accepted. On 13 September, after Joshua had entered the WBC heavyweight rankings at sixth place, it was announced by Joshua's promoters that his side had accepted the terms proposed by Fury's side for a Fury–Joshua fight on 3 December.

Fight card

Notes

References

2022 in boxing
Boxing matches
Boxing matches involving Tyson Fury
Boxing matches involving Anthony Joshua
World Boxing Council heavyweight championship matches